Final Cut of Director is a 2016 Indian Hindi-language action thriller film that was written and directed by Bharathiraja. The film stars Nana Patekar and Arjun Sarja, with Rukmini Vijayakumar, Kajal Aggarwal, Niyamat Khan, Vatsal Sheth, and Mushtaq Khan in supporting roles. Himesh Reshammiya composed the music and cinematography was done by B. Kannan. The film was released on 21 October 2016.

The film, which was originally titled Cinema, was retitled Final Cut of Director and had a limited release in 2016. Final Cut of Director marks Tamil director Bharathiraja's return to Hindi cinema after a gap. The film was intended to be the Hindi debut of Arjun Sarja but its release was delayed.

Final Cut of Director was first released in Tamil as Bommalattam in 2008. The Tamil version was almost entirely dubbed from the Hindi version but some scenes were re-filmed with Manivannan, who replaced Mushtaq Khan, and  Vivek. Despite being filmed in Hindi, Final Cut of Director failed financially in Hindi markets but the Tamil version was a success. Rukhmini Vijayakumar's portrayal of a transgender woman was praised.

Plot 
Film director Rana is filming a scene with the female lead of his upcoming film. Rana is unhappy with the actor's behaviour and he decides to find another female lead. He finally finds Trishna suitable but never discloses her identity to the media, and the film's wallpapers do not show the names of the male and female leads. The film is eventually completed and Rana must attend a press meeting about his film's release but he does not attend the meeting and is shown to have had an illegal relationship with Trishna. At this instant, the film's producer calls Rana and the media discovers his location and who he is with. Press reporters gather at the hotel where Rana is staying; he escapes from them and get into a car. The press chase him, and Rana kills Trishna by creating an accident-like situation.

SP Vivek Varma, a Central Bureau of Investigation (CBI) officer, takes charge of this murder case along with two previous murder cases in which Rana is also a suspect. Rana is arrested and taken into CBI custody and Vivek starts his interrogation. Meanwhile, a poet named Anitha, who is a superfan of Rana, is revealed to be Vivek's lover and worked as an assistant to Rana during his filmmaking. During the interrogation, Rana reveals how he met Trishna and their relationship.

Trishna was a dancer who performed in temples and at small-time shows across Andhra Pradesh. Rana hires Trishna as his muse, and they become lovers. When a hairdresser is left homeless, Rana offers her a place in his room; another unit member sees this and informs Rana's wife. The next morning, as Rana is having sex with Trishna, his wife arrives, beats up the hairdresser, and accuses Rana of being a womanizer. Rana continues filming, appearing to be unperturbed by the incident but cries while instructing his actors. His assistant notices this; she and Rana are also shown to be lovers, and she comforts Rana. At the village in which they are filming, the village chief is notorious and constantly lusts over Trishna. Rana states he will kill the chief if he causes more inconvenience. The next day, the chief is murdered. Vivek recalls this and states Rana committed this murder but Rana neither agrees with or denies this statement.

Rana faints shortly after the interrogation and is taken to hospital. Vivek follows him there and recollects the incident of the second murder. After finishing their schedule at the village, the unit travels to Malaysia to continue the filming. There, Rana has to meet the financier's son, who is also the film's second male lead. The financier's son flirts with Trishna and constantly tries to approach her, with which she is uncomfortable. Shortly afterwards, the financier' son is also found murdered and Rana again neither agrees or denies this murder. Anitha, upon witnessing what Vivek is doing, confronts him and accuses him of trying to pin down Rana. Anitha offers Vivek her body in exchange for him leaving Rana alone. Vivek tells Anitha about the complications of the investigation. A badly burnt body in a car that fell from a cliff belongs to a man and all of the evidence at the crime scene is fake and used as props for filmmaking.

With the mystery unsolved, Rana is released due to the absence of strong evidence to convict him. He goes to live in a secluded bungalow with his assistant. Vivek follows Rana there and uncovers the mystery. Trishna is revealed to be a man whose real name is Babu and comes from a very poor background. Babu's mother raised him as a girl so his demeanor has become feminine since he is small. Rana sees an opportunity to introduce Babu as a female hero and provide financial aid to his struggling family. Babu  killed the village chief, who discovered Babu's true sex and demanded Babu have sex with him in return for concealing the truth. Babu also killed the financier's son, who falsely told Babu he has photographed Babu while he was bathing. Rana asks Vivek to give Babu the lightest-available sentence but Vivek decides to release him. Rana thanks Vivek, who says Rana is a greater human being than he is a director.

Cast 

Nana Patekar as Rana
Arjun Sarja as Vivek Varma IPS, SP in CBI
Rukmini Vijayakumar as Trishna / Babu
Kajal Aggarwal as Anitha
Niyamat Khan as a shooting assistant
Vatsal Sheth as Nitish Kumar
Ranjitha as Rana's wife
Mushtaq Khan as the village chief
Baby Ankitha as Rana's daughter
B. Kannan as the doctor and himself

Tamil version

Vivek as Madurai
Manivannan as the village chief
Chitra Lakshmanan as the makeup man
Joe Malloori as a crew member (uncredited)

Production 
Final Cut of Director was launched in Malaysia in 2006 with the title Cinema for the Hindi version and Bommalattam for the Tamil version. Bharathiraja decided to make the film in Hindi after casting Nana Patekar to play Rana. Vikram was initially considered to play Arjun's role. Arjun Sarja was cast as Vivek, a CBI officer although he was not fluent in Hindi. Rukmini Vijayakumar was cast in an important role. The film was to be made in Hindi and dubbed into Tamil. Cinema was based on a true incident that took place in Hampi. The film was mostly made in Mumbai and Goa. Scenes involving Nana Patekar and Arjun Sarja were shot in Chennai. Nana and Bharathiraja fought during filming; according to Bharathiraja; "We fought with each other a couple of times. However the fights helped us to sharpen our thoughts and to shape the movie in a nice way."  Nagravi of Insight Media bought the film's rights. Bharathiraja and cinematographer Kannan said Final Cut of Director is one of the best films they had made.

Final Cut of Director was originally the film lead debut of Kajal Aggarwal, who appeared in a Hindi film called Kyun! Ho Gaya Na..., but Final Cut of Director was delayed and Lakshmi Kalyanam became her first release.

Soundtrack 
The soundtrack was composed by Himesh Reshammiya.

Hindi version
Lyrics by Sameer.
"Zindagi" – Sunidhi Chauhan
"Dhola Dholiya" – Afsar, Sneha Panth
"Chakle Chakle" – Akriti Kakkar
"Aaha Aaha" – Himesh Reshammiya, Manjeera Ganguly
"Leja Leja" – Gayatri Iyer Ganjawala

Tamil version
Lyrics by Snehan, Thenmozhi Das and Viveka.
"Aaha Aaha" – Karthik, Pop Shalini
"Check Check" – Suchithra
"Nenjil Dola" – Anuradha Sriram
"Va Va Thalaiva" – Gayathri
"Koyambedu" – Mathangi

Release 
The Hindi and Tamil versions of Final Cut of Director were scheduled for release in 2008 but the Hindi version's release was postponed. The Tamil version was scheduled to release in June 2008 but was delayed until December. The Tamil version was a box office success. The Hindi version of Final Cut of Director was released in October 2016 and went unnoticed due to lack of promotion.

Critical reception 

Nowrunning wrote: "Like aged and mellowed spirits, director Bharati Raja has matured and levitated towards one of his first loves—a whodunit". Behindwoods wrote: "Bommalattam is a perfectly crafted and executed investigative thriller. The surprise factor being Bharathiraja’s tautly woven screenplay—it negates the chance of tedium, even for a fraction of a second." The critic added; "Irregular lip-sync of actors also reveal that the movie is in fact dubbed into Tamil after having been shot in Hindi directly". Sify wrote; "hats off to Bharathiraja for creating a taut thriller which is a masterpiece of moods, anxieties and dread. Quite simply, unmissable." Rediff wrote: "Bharathiraja's screenplay lacks punch. He seems to have been confused about whether to give importance to the characters themselves, or the thriller portion." The Hindu wrote: "The pluses of Bommalattam place Bharatiraaja on a pedestal. The minuses play spoilsport." The critic said; "It’s obvious that many of the scenes have been filmed in Hindi alone—flawed lip sync makes a mockery of some of the serious scenes".

Accolades 
2008
Vijay Award for Best Make Up Artistes – Vanitha Krishnamoorthy, Harinath – Nominated
Ananda Vikatan Cinema Awards – Best Debut Actress – Rukmini Vijayakumar – Won

References

External links 

2010s Hindi-language films
2016 films
2016 multilingual films
2016 thriller films
Films about filmmaking
Films directed by Bharathiraja
Films scored by Himesh Reshammiya
Indian multilingual films
Indian thriller films